The 2004 Mid-Eastern Athletic Conference men's basketball tournament took place March 8–13, 2004, at the Arthur Ashe Athletic Center in Richmond, Virginia.  defeated , 58–51 in the championship game, to capture its first MEAC Tournament title. The Rattlers earned an automatic bid to the 2004 NCAA tournament as No. 16 seed in the East region. In the play-in round, Florida A&M defeated  to advance to the round of 64 where they fell to No. 1 seed Kentucky 96–76.

Format
All eleven conference members participated, with the top 5 teams receiving a bye to the quarterfinal round. After seeds 6 through 11 completed games in the first round, teams were re-seeded. The lowest remaining seed was slotted against the top seed, next lowest remaining faced the #2 seed, and third lowest remaining seed squared off against the #3 seed.

Bracket

References

MEAC men's basketball tournament
2003–04 Mid-Eastern Athletic Conference men's basketball season
MEAC men's basketball tournament